Ballston Lake is a lake that is located in the hamlet of Ballston Lake, New York in the town of Ballston. Fish species present in the lake include northern pike, smallmouth bass, largemouth bass, yellow perch, carp, pumpkinseed sunfish, walleye, bluegill and brown bullhead.  

The lake is meromictic, meaning its deeper waters never mix with the surface layer.

In 2021 both the cartop boat launch on Outlet Road the private one located at Finnigan's On The Lake Restaurant were closed, leaving no public boating access to the lake. 

In February 2022, the public fishing pier on the north end of the lake was closed due to damage sustained by ice over the winter.

See also
New York State Baseball Hall of Fame

References

Lakes of New York (state)
Lakes of Saratoga County, New York